Albert Abramovitz (1879–1963) was an American woodcut artist and painter. His work is in the permanent collections of the Metropolitan Museum of Art, the National Gallery of Art, and the Smithsonian American Art Museum.

References

1879 births
1963 deaths
American male painters
Artists from New York (state)
People from Nassau County, New York
20th-century American painters
20th-century American male artists
Emigrants from the Russian Empire to the United States